Kathy Edmonston is an American politician currently serving as a member of the Louisiana House of Representatives. She represents District 88 and is a member of the Republican Party. She assumed office on January 13, 2020.

Edmonston was previously a member of the Louisiana Board of Elementary and Secondary Education representing District 6 from 2016 to 2020.

References

External links
 Kathy Edmonston at VoteSmart

Living people
Republican Party members of the Louisiana House of Representatives
Women state legislators in Louisiana
Women in Louisiana politics
21st-century American politicians
21st-century American women politicians
Louisiana State University alumni
People from Gonzales, Louisiana
Year of birth missing (living people)